Anksa Kara (born March 24, 1985) is a Cameroonian-born pornographic actress.

Biography 
She arrived in France in 1993. In 2005, she started working as a stripper in several Parisian clubs. She later became a nude model and a pornographic actress.

In June 2009, Anksa Kara was featured in the porn trade magazine Hot Vidéo (No. 220). Later that year, she was nominated for the Hot d'Or for Best starlet. Also in 2009, she created her own company, Anksa Kara & Co, with the aim of promoting Black adult actresses in France. She has since appeared in various French porn productions. She also appeared in several television shows broadcast on the French channel Paris Première and in mainstream productions, including several films directed by Jean-Pierre Mocky.

Filmography

Erotic and pornographic films 
 2007 : Kama Sutra black by Jean-Pierre Charmontel (Java Consulting)
 2007 : Taxi de nuit by Fabien Lafait (JTC Video)
 2007 : Défonce Anale à La Lhermite Volume 1 by Philippe Lhermite (Telsev)
 2007 : Les Castings de Lhermite Volume 29 by Philippe Lhermite (Telsev)
 2007 : Les Inclassables de Lhermite Volume 5 by Philippe Lhermite (Telsev)
 2007 : Soumission Promise Volume 2 by Philippe Lhermite (Telsev)
 2008 : Allumeuses 2 by Fabien Lafait (JTC Video)
 2008 : Disco Sex by Fabien Lafait (JTC Video)
 2008 : Les Castings de Fred Coppula, Acte 1 by Fred Coppula (Fred Coppula Productions)
 2008 : X Amat Special Blacks by Fabien Lafait (JTC Video)
 2009 : Cinémax by Max Antoine (Fred Coppula Productions)
 2010 : Dark Dreams - More Dirty Fantasies by Thomas S. Allan
 2011 : Dans Ton Cul 4 : Au boulot by Luka (Saucisson Prod)
 2011 : Journal d'une Femme de Chambre by Max Antoine (Fred Coppula Productions)
 2011 : Orgy The XXX Championship by Hervé Bodilis (Marc Dorcel)
 2012 : Ça Baise au Sauna by Luka (Marc Dorcel)
 2012 : La Journaliste by Pascal Lucas (Marc Dorcel)
 2013 : Patrouille de nuit by Kris Bakelit (Marc Dorcel)

Cinema 
 2010 : Eject by Jean-Marc Vincent : Pam, the black prostitute
 2011 : Le Dossier Toroto by Jean-Pierre Mocky : Irma, l'intendante
 2012 : Le Mentor by Jean-Pierre Mocky
 2013 : Le Bonheur by Fabrice Grange

TV performances 
 2007 : Les Tabous de... Le plaisir féminin TV program of Karine Le Marchand (France 2, November 14, 2007)
 2007 : First interview of Anksa Kara with Anna Martin and Fabien Lafait in Noctambule on Pigalle, Paris (Paris Dernière, December 27, 2007)
 2009 : Photoshoot of Anksa Kara & Co. in April 2009 for « Black Power! Yes We Can » (Hot Vidéo, June 2009)
 2009 : Anksa Kara chez Magloire (Cap 24, August 2009)
 2009 : Anksa Kara & Co. on Hot d'Or ceremony in Paris (October 20, 2009)
 2010 : Enquêtes très spéciales (Direct Star, September 7, 2010)
 2010 : Interview of Anksa Kara during Hot Vidéo night party (Hot Vidéo, December 21, 2010)
 2011 : Exclusive Video DSK Sofitel with Anksa Kara and Josué Rocher (YouTube)
 2011 : Les scandaleuses d'Anksa Kara & Co. setting a hot mood in salon du Louvre (Paris Dernière, November 2011)
 2012 : Rive droite - Dîner libertin TV program of Guillaume Durand with Anksa Kara (Paris Première, January 28, 2012)
 2012 : Les Jouets d'Anksa Kara (Paris Dernière, May 2012)
 2013 : Myster Mocky présente season 3 : Auto-Stop (Canal Jimmy, June 4, 2013)
 2013 : Myster Mocky présente season 3 : Derrière la porte close (Canal Jimmy, June 4, 2013)

Clips 
 2009 : Hombre Que Soy (Shaka Ponk)
 2010 : Bistouflex (Seth Gueko)

Publications

Awards 
 2009 : Hot d'Or : nominated Best french starlet

References

External links 

 
 
 

1985 births
Living people
People from Nkongsamba
French pornographic film actresses
Female adult models
Cameroonian emigrants to France